Deinandra lobbii, the threeray tarweed, is a North American species of plants in the tribe Madieae within the family Asteraceae.

Distribution
The plant is endemic to California, though with a disjunct (discontinuous) distribution. It has been found in the northeastern part of the state (Modoc, Lassen, and Shasta Cos.) the San Francisco Bay region (Solano, Contra Costa, and Alameda Cos.) and west-central region (Monterey, San Benito, and northern San Luis Obispo Cos).

Calflora also reports a collection from Santa Clara County but this is from the central part of the campus of Stanford University, hence most likely a cultivated specimen.

Description
Deinandra lobbii is an annual herb up to 70 cm (28 inches) tall.

It has numerous flower heads in a showy array. Each head has 3 (occasionally 4) yellow ray florets plus 3 (occasionally 4) disc florets with yellow corollas and red or dark purple anthers.

References

External links
 Calflora Database: Deinandra lobbii (Threeray tarweed)

lobbii
Endemic flora of California
Natural history of the California chaparral and woodlands
Natural history of the California Coast Ranges
Natural history of the San Francisco Bay Area
Plants described in 1883
Taxa named by Edward Lee Greene
Flora without expected TNC conservation status